Jussi is a male given name. In Finnish originally it is short for Juhani or Juho, Finnish for Johannes/John, but is also recognized as a name in its own right for official purposes. It can also be short for Justus, or a Finnish form of Justin.

Notable people with the name
 Jussi 69 (1972), drummer of The 69 Eyes
 Jussi Adler-Olsen (1950), Danish writer
 Jussi Björling (1911–1960), Swedish tenor
 Jussi Chydenius (1972), Finnish musician
 Jussi Halla-aho (1971) Finnish Slavic linguist, blogger and a politician.
 Jussi Hautamäki (1979), Finnish ski jumper
 Jussi Jokinen (1983), Finnish ice hockey player
 Jussi Jääskeläinen (1975), Finnish football player
 Jussi Järventaus (born 1951), Finnish politician 
 Jussi Kurikkala (1912–1951), Finnish cross-country skier
 Jussi Kujala (1983), Finnish football player
 Jussi Lampi (1961), Finnish musician
 Jussi Markkanen (1975), Finnish ice hockey player
 Jussi Mäkilä (1974), Finnish cyclist
 Jussi Pajunen (1954), mayor of Helsinki
 Jussi Sydänmaa (1973), guitarist of the band Lordi
 Jussi Timonen (1983), Finnish ice hockey player
 Jussi "Juba" Tuomola (1965), Finnish cartoonist
 Jussi Veikkanen (1981), Finnish cyclist
 Jussi Wickström (1983), guitarist of Turisas

See also
 Jussi Award, a Finnish annual film award
 Juss (given name), an Estonian variant 

Finnish masculine given names